Rybkowo is a settlement in the administrative district of Gmina Koronowo, within Bydgoszcz County, Kuyavian-Pomeranian Voivodeship, in north-central Poland. The town is at the intersection of National Road No. 25 and Provincial Road No. 237, and is also located in the currently suspended Tuchola-Koronowo railway line. It was formerly a collective farm, and until 1954, the town was the seat of the Makowarsko commune.

References

Villages in Bydgoszcz County